WBRI (1500 AM) is a daytimer radio station licensed to Indianapolis, Indiana, serving the Indianapolis metropolitan area.  It broadcasts a Christian talk and teaching radio format and is owned by the Wilkins Radio Network, Inc.  The broadcast license is held by Heritage Christian Radio, Inc.  WBRI is one of the oldest Christian talk stations in the United States, starting the format in 1964.

By day, WBRI is powered at 5,000 watts.  It uses a directional antenna with a three-tower array.  The transmitter is on Adams Boulevard Drive near East 62nd Street.  But because 1500 AM is a clear channel frequency reserved for Class A KSTP in St. Paul, Minnesota and WFED in Washington, D.C., WBRI must sign off at sunset to prevent interference.  Programming is heard around the clock on 250 watt FM translator W244DN at 96.7 MHz.

History
On , the station signed on the air.  The original call sign was WNDY.  In 1964, the station changed its call letters to WBRI and its format to Christian radio.

In 2003, WBRI was sold to Heritage Christian Radio, Inc., a subsidiary of Wilkins Radio Network, Inc.  The price tag was $1.5 million.  Wilkins continued the Christian programming, using shows from its own network.

References

External links
Official website
Indiana Radio Archive, WBRI

FCC History Cards for WBRI

BRI
BRI
BRI
Mass media in Indianapolis
Religion in Indianapolis